Mogens Emil Pedersen, nickname MEP (9 May 1928 – 5 January 2014) was a Danish journalist. He died on 5 January 2014, aged 85, in Gentofte Municipality.

Career 
In 1970, Pedersen became editor-in-chief to Se & Hør until his retirement in 1997.

References

1928 births
2014 deaths
20th-century Danish journalists